Benjamin Ferguson may refer to:
Ben Ferguson (born 1981), American radio host
Ben Ferguson (snowboarder) (born 1995), American snowboarder
Benjamin Ferguson (politician) (1820–1888), Wisconsin state senator
Benjamin F. Ferguson (?–1905), Chicago merchant and philanthropist